Sherry "S. D." Johnson is a Canadian poet, who won the ReLit Award for poetry in 2001 for her collection Hymns to Phenomena.

Based in Saskatchewan, Johnson published her first poetry collection Pale Grace in 1995.

References

21st-century Canadian poets
Canadian women poets
Writers from Saskatchewan
Living people
Year of birth missing (living people)
21st-century Canadian women writers